Timothy Daniel Brand (born 29 November 1998) is an Australian field hockey player who plays as a forward for Dutch club Klein Zwitserland and the Australian national team.

Brand was born in the Netherlands and grew up in Chatswood, New South Wales.

Club career
Brand previously played for the NSW Pride in the Hockey One. After the 2020 Summer Olympics he joined Dutch Hoofdklasse club Klein Zwitserland.

International career
He made his senior international debut in June 2018, in a test series against Germany.

In June 2018, Brand was selected in the Australian national squad for the 2018 Champions Trophy in Breda, Netherlands. The team won the tournament, defeating India 3–1 in a penalty shoot-out after the final finished a 1–1 draw.
Tim has been selected in the 2018 Australian Men's Hockey Team to participate at the World Cup, in Odisha 28-16 December.

Brand was selected in the Kookaburras Olympics squad for the Tokyo 2020 Olympics. The team reached the final for the first time since 2004 but couldn't achieve gold, beaten by Belgium in a shootout.

References

External links
 
 
 
 

1998 births
Living people
Australian people of Dutch descent
Sportspeople from Gouda, South Holland
Australian male field hockey players
Male field hockey forwards
2018 Men's Hockey World Cup players
Field hockey players at the 2020 Summer Olympics
Olympic field hockey players of Australia
Men's Hoofdklasse Hockey players
HC Klein Zwitserland players
Olympic silver medalists for Australia
Medalists at the 2020 Summer Olympics
Olympic medalists in field hockey
Field hockey players at the 2022 Commonwealth Games
Commonwealth Games gold medallists for Australia
Commonwealth Games medallists in field hockey
Sportsmen from New South Wales
2023 Men's FIH Hockey World Cup players
Medallists at the 2022 Commonwealth Games